The autonomous community of the Basque Country within Spain contains several comarcas or eskualdeak in the Basque language, referring to local districts, grouped into its three long-established provinces. 

The Basque Government's statistics department Eustat has divided the districts using a 20-comarca model (seven in Biscay, seven in Gipuzkoa and six in Álava) in its reports relating to the local economy and demographic trends on a consistent basis since at least 1999:

List of comarcas

Alternative definitions
As the comarca boundaries are not defined in law, various other broadly similar combinations have been published depending on the date, range and purpose of the data collection. Examples include:

Biscay province: the conurbations on either side of the Estuary of Bilbao within the Greater Bilbao comarca, known as the Left Bank and the Right Bank, are sometimes counted separately both from one another and from the city of Bilbao itself. The Hego Uribe area south of Bilbao tends to remain grouped with the city when other adjustments are made, or is linked with Arratia-Nervión if counted as an outlying zone. 

Similarly, the western part of Goierri (around Zumarraga) has been recorded as the separate  (Upper Urola) district. In the Donostialdea comarca (by far the most heavily populated, containing the city of San Sebastián and its satellite towns), the eastern part centred on Errenteria and Pasaia has been referred to as Oarsoaldea, and in some cases this has been combined with neighbouring Bidasoaldea, with the Oarsoaldea name even being adopted by some for this larger area. Less commonly, the name  has been used to refer collectively to the cluster of towns south of San Sebastián (Lasarte-Oria, Hernani, Astigarraga, Andoain). 

Álava province: the main deviation from the Eustat comarcas (known here as cuadrillas) is in the representation of the capital Vitoria-Gasteiz, which alternatively has its own district comprising its urban municipality alone. In this alignment the western part of the rump  comarca is assigned to Gorbeialdea. The territory of Treviño is entirely surrounded by Álava, but is an exclave of the Province of Burgos and does not figure in the Basque considerations (its future status is a matter of dispute between the administrations).

Population contrasts
As with the municipalities across Spain, the populations of each comarca vary widely; rural sectors of Álava cover only a few thousand residents each, while its capital Vitoria-Gasteiz (which is also a single municipality) is considered either to be in its own comarca or by far the most prominent component of the wider , containing over 250,000 residents under either arrangement. In Gipuzkoa, the Donostialdea comarca (population 330,000) includes not only the provincial capital San Sebastián (municipality population 185,000) but many of the smaller towns surrounding the city, leading to two further subdivisions being created in some contexts to represent these communities in a more balanced way. The most striking contrast is in Biscay, where the capital city Bilbao (again a single municipality with approximately 350,000 residents) is just one part of the Greater Bilbao comarca which has 850,000 within its boundaries. Bilbao's eight city districts are comparable in population to four of the province's other more rural comarcas, despite in theory being two administrative levels below.

See also
 :Category:People by comarca in the Basque Country (autonomous community)
 Comarcas of Spain
 List of municipalities in the Basque Country

References

Comarcas of the Basque Country